Antiguraleus perfluans is a species of sea snail, a marine gastropod mollusk in the family Mangeliidae.

Description

Distribution
This marine species occurs of KwaZulu-Natal, South Africa

References

 Barnard, K. H. 1958. Contributions to the knowledge of South African marine Mollusca. Part I. Gastropoda: Prosobranchiata: Toxoglossa. Annals of the South African Museum 44 (4): 73-163, figs. 1-30, pI. 1.
  Kilburn, R. N. "Turridae (Mollusca: Gastropoda) of southern Africa and Mozambique. Part 7. Subfamily Crassispirinae, section 2." Annals of the Natal Museum 35.1 (1994): 177-228.

External links
  Tucker, J.K. 2004 Catalog of recent and fossil turrids (Mollusca: Gastropoda). Zootaxa 682:1-1295.

Endemic fauna of South Africa
perfluans
Gastropods described in 1958